Semboku may refer to several places in Japan:

 the city Semboku, Akita (Semboku-shi)
 Semboku District, Akita (Semboku-gun), several districts
 Semboku, Akita (town) (Semboku-machi), former town

See also 
 Semboku Rapid Railway, a railway company in Osaka